The Mystic Nine Side Story: Flowers Bloom in February is a side story of the drama The Mystic Nine. The web film was co-produced by iQiyi, Dragon TV and NP Entertainment and was released on October 20, 2016. This spin off is a continuation of the television series whereby it solely focuses on character Er Yuehong portrayed by Lay Zhang.

Background 
The side story serves as a spin off and continuation to The Mystic Nine which is a prequel to the Chinese television series The Lost Tomb based on the internet novel Daomu Biji. The plot of the story revolves around the main character of The Mystic Nine which is Er Yuehong.

Synopsis 
The side story narrates the effort of relocating a cultural relic safeguarded beneath an ancient tomb during the Sino-Japanese era. Er Yuehong undertook this mission by approaching the tomb which on surface is a heavily pre-occupied Japanese army base. Tapping his skills for Chinese opera and utilising his connections, he performed as an opera singer while fighting off the Japanese soldiers on the other. With his wisdom and bravery, he strives with his might to recover the relic.

Cast 
 Lay Zhang as Er Yuehong (二月红), second master of the mystic nine clan. An expert at tomb raiding due to his family background, but chooses to become an opera singer due to his passion.
 Zhang Zheng Yang as Shenggong Weilai (神宫未来), the second in command to Qiu Shan who is ruthless and would stop at nothing to achieve victory.
 Ming Zheng as Qiu Shan (秋山), a Japanese commander who harbours a deep fondness for Chinese opera and culture.
 He Yujun as Ji An (吉安), friend to Er Yuehong. Perished while completing his mission. 
 Liu Weiling as Hong Gu (红杏), servant of Er Yuehong who accompanied him on his adventure.
 Mou Yuandi as Bai Zhanmei (白湛梅), frenemy to Er Yuehong who rendered his assistance to the latter.

Soundtrack

Reception 
The film streamed over 93 million views on IQiYi.

Awards and nominations

External links 
The Mystic Nine Side Story: Flowers Bloom in February on iQiyi
The Mystic Nine Side Story: Flowers Bloom in February on iQIYI

References 

2016 Chinese television seasons
2010s Chinese television series
The Lost Tomb
IQIYI original programming
Chinese web series